The Rencontre Formation (locally pronounced Rown-Counter) is a geological formation just below the Cambrian-Ediacaran boundary in Newfoundland, deposited in a fault-bounded enclosed basin.

It is subdivided into five depositional phases, with two subsequent phases in a seven-phase series corresponding to the overlying Chapel Island Formation (900 m thick in this basin) and Random Formation (250 m thick in this basin).

Phase one - 300 m - conglomerate dominated, some sandstone and minor siltstones
Phase 2 - 150 m - sands and silts
Phase 3 - 180 m - silts and minor sands; lower silts are grey-green, glauconitic, wave-rippled and mud-cracked; upper silts becoming red
Phase 4 - 200 m - coarse sands
Phase 5 - greater than 200 m - arenites and red silts.

References

Geologic formations of Canada
Geology of Newfoundland and Labrador